Sivert Andreas Nielsen (8 October 1823 - 18 August 1904) was a Norwegian politician for the Liberal Party.

He was born in Brønnøy.

He was elected to the Norwegian Parliament in 1859. He was not re-elected in 1861, but returned in 1865 to serve twelve more terms. When political parties were introduced in the 1880s, Nielsen joined the Liberal Party. He served four terms as President of the Storting.

References

1823 births
1904 deaths
Presidents of the Storting
Members of the Storting
Liberal Party (Norway) politicians
Nordland politicians
People from Brønnøy